Ramsey Nasr (born 28 January 1974) is a Dutch author and actor of mixed descent, half Palestinian, half Dutch.

He was born in Rotterdam. Before Nasr was Poet of the City of Antwerp, Belgium, in 2005.

In June 2014, an adaptation for the stage (in Dutch) of Ayn Rand's novel The Fountainhead (Toneelgroep Amsterdam) was presented at the Holland Festival, directed by Ivo van Hove, with Nasr as Howard Roark.

Filmography
1995 
1998 
1999 One Man and His Dog
2000 Mariken
2001 
2001 Magonia
2002 The Enclave
2003 Hotel Bellevue  
2004 Armando
2004 Mon ange
2005 Live!
2008 In Real Life
2011 Goltzius and the Pelican Company

TV series
2011-2015 Overspel The Adulterer
2019-2021 Oogappels

Toneelgroep Amsterdam

 2014 Mary Stuart - Davison
 2013-2016 Long Day's Journey into Night - Jamie Tyrone
 2014-2017 The Fountainhead - Howard Roark
 2015-2017 Kings of War - Henry V, Richmond
 2015-2017 Husbands and Wives - Gabe
 2015-2017 The other voice - Hoofdrol
 2016-2017 Roman Tragedies - Menenius, Lepidus

References

External links
Ramsey Nasr, personal website

 Ramsey Nasr at Toneelgroep Amsterdam

Dutch male film actors
Dutch male television actors
Dutch male stage actors
Dutch male poets
Dutch poets laureate
Writers from Rotterdam
People from Salfit
Dutch people of Palestinian descent
1974 births
Living people